The Ninth Dynasty of ancient Egypt (Dynasty IX) is often combined with the 7th, 8th, 10th and early 11th Dynasties under the group title First Intermediate Period.
The dynasty that seems to have supplanted the Eighth Dynasty is extremely obscure. The takeover by the rulers of Herakleopolis was violent and is reflected in Manetho's description of Achthoes, the founder of the dynasty, as 'more terrible than his predecessors', who 'wrought evil things for those in all Egypt".

Rulers
The Ninth Dynasty was founded at Herakleopolis Magna, and the Tenth Dynasty continued there. At this time Egypt was not unified, and there is some overlap between these and other local dynasties. The Turin Canon lists eighteen kings for this royal line, but their names are damaged, unidentifiable, or lost.

The following is a possible list of rulers of the Ninth Dynasty based on the Turin Canon, as egyptologists have differing opinions about the order of succession within the two dynasties. Among them, only Meryibre Khety and Nebkaure Khety are undoubtedly attested by archaeological finds:

References

 
States and territories established in the 3rd millennium BC
States and territories disestablished in the 3rd millennium BC
09
09
09
3rd-millennium BC establishments in Egypt
3rd-millennium BC disestablishments in Egypt
3rd millennium BC in Egypt